Papoose (from the Algonquian papoose, meaning "child") is an American English word whose present meaning is "a Native American child" (regardless of tribe) or, even more generally, any child, usually used as a term of endearment, often in the context of the child's mother.  However, the word is considered offensive to many Native Americans whose tribes did not use the word. The word had early use in English in bounty notices in New England. The nature of the term papoose to describe Native American babies is comparable to use of "pickaninny" to describe black children, although the word is less widely understood as pejorative.

The word came originally from the Narragansett tribe. In 1643, Roger Williams recorded the word in his A Key Into the Language of America, helping to popularize it.

Papoose carrier
Cradle boards and other child carriers used by Native Americans are known by various names. In Algonquin history, the term papoose is sometimes used to refer to a child carrier. However, there are many different terms among the 573 federally recognized tribes, nations, and communities.

References

External links

Child safety
Native American culture